Dariush Yazdani (born June 2, 1977) is an Iranian former footballer who played as a midfielder.

Career statistics

Club

Honors

Club
Bargh Shiraz
 Hazfi Cup: 1996–97

Esteghlal
 Iranian Football League: 1997–98
 Hazfi Cup: 1997–98

Bayer Leverkusen
 Bundesliga runner-up: 1999–2000
 DFB-Pokal runner-up: 1999–2000

Saipa
 Iranian League: 2006–07

International
Iran
 Asian Games: 1998
 AFC Asian Cup bronze medal: 1996

References

1977 births
Living people
Iranian footballers
Iran international footballers
Association football midfielders
Bargh Shiraz players
Esteghlal F.C. players
Bayer 04 Leverkusen players
Bayer 04 Leverkusen II players
Bundesliga players
emirates Club players
Payam Mashhad players
1996 AFC Asian Cup players
2000 AFC Asian Cup players
Expatriate footballers in Germany
Expatriate footballers in Belgium
Expatriate soccer players in the United States
Iranian expatriate footballers
Iranian expatriate football managers
R. Charleroi S.C. players
Pegah Gilan players
Saipa F.C. players
Orange County SC players
Belgian Pro League players
USL Championship players
Paykan F.C. players
People from Shiraz
Asian Games gold medalists for Iran
Asian Games medalists in football
Footballers at the 1998 Asian Games
Orange County SC coaches
Medalists at the 1998 Asian Games
Iranian expatriate sportspeople in Germany
Iranian expatriate sportspeople in Belgium
Sportspeople from Fars province